Ruben Agnus "Bud" Whitehead (born January 1, 1939) is a former American football defensive back in the American Football League. A 16th-round selection (127th overall pick) of the 1961 AFL Draft, Whitehead played eight seasons with the San Diego Chargers (1961–1968). He had 10 interceptions his senior year of college football at Florida State.

Early life
Born and raised in Marianna, Florida, he played football for Marianna High School before attending Florida State. He was the second child of Clara Peacock and Alter Whitehead, with one older brother, Jim Whitehead, and four younger siblings, brothers Gary, Willie and Ronnie  Whitehead and sister Denise Whitehead.

See also
 List of American Football League players

References

American football defensive backs
Florida State Seminoles football players
San Diego Chargers players
Players of American football from Florida
People from Marianna, Florida
1939 births
Living people
American Football League players